P. Kumar (born 21 April 1971) is an Indian politician. He is popularly known as 'ப.குமார்'. member of the Parliament of India from Thiruchirapalli constituency since 2009. He represents AIADMK.

Personal life 
He was born in Pudukkottai district, Gandarvakkottai taluk, Punalkulam, Tamil Nadu. He is the son of Palanivel and Muniyammal. He has one son and a daughter.

Politics 
He joined AIADMK in 1991. In 2009 he was nominated to participate in the Lok Sabha election. 

In February 2014 he was re-nominated for the Lok Sabha seat for Thiruchirapalli. In 2018 he was appointed as AIADMK trichy urban secretary and served as state youth wing secretary for 5 years. He is Deputy Leader in Lok Sabha for AIADMK. In the 2014 Lok Sabha election he defeated Mu. Anbhalagan. 

He is known for his organising abilities. He was called district secretary "of trichy AIADMK.

Elections

References

All India Anna Dravida Munnetra Kazhagam politicians
Living people
1971 births
Lok Sabha members from Tamil Nadu
India MPs 2009–2014
People from Pudukkottai district
Politicians from Tiruchirappalli
India MPs 2014–2019